Rodrigo Nahuel Moreira Lima (born 23 February 2001) is a Uruguayan professional footballer who plays as a forward for Uruguayan Segunda División side Rentistas.

Career

Club
Moreira was promoted into the first-team of Rentistas in 2018, making his debut on 3 March in a Uruguayan Segunda División defeat away to Villa Teresa.

International
Moreira has played and scored for the Uruguay U16s at international level.

Career statistics
.

References

External links

2001 births
Living people
People from Canelones Department
Uruguayan footballers
Uruguay youth international footballers
Association football forwards
Uruguayan Segunda División players
C.A. Rentistas players